James Benton Higgins Jr. (January 10, 1920 – June 6, 1991) was an American football player and coach and college athletics administrator. He played college football at Trinity University in Waxahachie, Texas and professionally in the National Football League (NFL) for one season, in 1941, with the Chicago Cardinals. Higgins served as the head football coach at Lamar State College of Technology—now known as Lamar University—in Beaumont, Texas from 1963 to 1962, compiling a record of 59–38–4. He was also the athletic director at Lamar from 1963 to 1983.

Higgins was an assistant coach at Lamar Tech for four seasons under Stan Lambert before succeeding him as head coach. After playing with the Cardinals, Higgins entered the United States Marine Corps, reaching the rank of major.

Head coaching record

College

References

External links
 
 

1920 births
1991 deaths
American football guards
American football linebackers
Chicago Cardinals players
Lamar Cardinals and Lady Cardinals athletic directors
Lamar Cardinals football coaches
Trinity Tigers football players
Junior college football coaches in the United States
United States Marine Corps officers
United States Marine Corps personnel of World War II
People from Ellis County, Texas
Coaches of American football from Texas
Players of American football from Texas
Military personnel from Texas